Mohammad Aliabad may refer to:
 Mohammad Aliabad, Golestan
 Mohammad Aliabad, Khuzestan
 Mohammad Aliabad, Kurdistan
 Mohammad Aliabad, Lorestan